Hwang San-ung (1925 – 15 January 2012) was a South Korean cyclist. He competed in the individual road race event at the 1948 Summer Olympics.

References

External links
 

1925 births
2012 deaths
South Korean male cyclists
Olympic cyclists of South Korea
Cyclists at the 1948 Summer Olympics
People from South Hamgyong